Seven Wonders of Nature may refer to:

 Seven Natural Wonders, a BBC Two television series which showed 'natural wonders' from areas around England
 New Seven Wonders of Nature, an initiative to create a list of seven natural wonders chosen through a global poll

See also 
 Wonders of the World#Seven Natural Wonders of the World